"Cool to Be a Fool" is a song co-written and recorded by American country music artist Joe Nichols.  It was released in September 2003 as the fourth and final single from his 2002 album Man with a Memory. The song reached number 18 on the U.S. Billboard Hot Country Singles & Tracks chart.  Nichols wrote this song with Steve Dean and Wil Nance.

Chart performance

References

2003 singles
Joe Nichols songs
Song recordings produced by Brent Rowan
Show Dog-Universal Music singles
2002 songs
Songs written by Steve Dean